David McCarthy (born 3 August 1988 in Waterford, Ireland) is a middle-distance athlete who has won international medals.

After being voted Irish athlete of the month for April 2009, McCarthy won the bronze medal in the men's 5000 metres at the 2009 European Under-23 Athletics Championships in Kaunas, Lithuania - the only Irish medal of the Championships. 

McCarthy's third-place finish saw him beaten by gold-medallist Mohamed Elbendir of Spain and French athlete Noureddine Smaïl - both of whom were African-born.
 
Coached by Ray Treacy, brother of 1984 Olympic marathon silver-medallist John Treacy, McCarthy as of the 2009-10 semester attends Providence College.

References

Irish male athletes
1988 births
Living people
Irish male long-distance runners